John William Minton (February 19, 1948 – March 20, 1995) was an American professional wrestler and actor, better known by his ring name, Big John Studd. Studd is best known for his appearances with the World Wide Wrestling Federation/World Wrestling Federation in the 1970s and 1980s.

Studd held a number of championships over his career, including the NWA American Heavyweight Championship, NWA Mid-Atlantic Tag Team Championship, and WWF World Tag Team Championship, and was the winner of the 1989 Royal Rumble. He was posthumously inducted into the WCW Hall of Fame in 1995 and the WWE Hall of Fame class of 2004.

Early life
John William Minton was born and raised in Butler, Pa. Minton was born to Helen Hayden and joined the United States Army and served as a military police officer.

Professional wrestling career

Early career (1972) 
Studd was trained by Killer Kowalski. He debuted in 1972 under the ring name "The Mighty Minton", wrestling on the Los Angeles NWA Hollywood Wrestling, where he formed a tag team with "Superstar" Billy Graham.

World Wide Wrestling Federation (1972–1973) 
In mid-1972, Studd joined the World Wide Wrestling Federation under the ring name "Chuck O'Connor", facing wrestlers such as Chief Jay Strongbow and Gorilla Monsoon. On September 12, 1972, Studd unsuccessfully challenged Pedro Morales for the WWWF World Heavyweight Championship. Later that month at Showdown at Shea, Studd lost to El Olympico by disqualification. He left the WWWF in February 1973.

Mid-Atlantic Championship Wrestling (1974–1983) 
In 1974, Studd joined Mid-Atlantic Championship Wrestling, where he wrestled as "Chuck O Connor".

In 1978, Studd teamed up with Ken Patera to win the Mid-Atlantic Tag Team titles.

In early 1982, Studd gained several unsuccessful title shots at the NWA World Heavyweight Championship, which was held by "The Nature Boy" Ric Flair at the time.

World Wide Wrestling Federation (1976–1977) 
In 1976, Studd returned to the World Wide Wrestling Federation, where he donned a mask and performed as "Executioner #2", teaming with Executioner #1 as The Executioners. On May 11, 1976, The Executioners defeated Louis Cerdan and Tony Parisi to win the WWF World Tag Team Championship. They held the championship until October 26, 1976, when they were stripped of the titles after a third Executioner (Nikolai Volkoff) interfered in a title defence. Manager Captain Lou Albano protested by claiming it was an "optical illusion". Studd left the WWWF once more in early 1977.

American Wrestling Association (1975–1976, 1980–1981) 
From 1975 to 1976, Studd performed for the American Wrestling Association. He returned in 1980 and left in 1981.

World Wrestling Federation (1982–1986, 1988–1989)

Feud with André the Giant (1982–1986) 
Studd jumped to the World Wrestling Federation in late 1982, and was paired with manager "Classy" Freddie Blassie. Studd quickly became a monster heel, adopting a gimmick of bringing a stretcher to the ring and beating his opponents so badly they would be taken out on the stretcher.

While Studd became a top challenger for the WWF World Championship, held by Bob Backlund, it was his feud with 7'4" (224 cm),  André the Giant over who was professional wrestling's 'true giant' that earned him main event status. Studd and Blassie had issued a "Bodyslam Challenge," offering $10,000 (and later, $15,000) to any wrestler who could slam him before boasting that he (Studd) could not be slammed. After several wrestlers were unsuccessful in answering Studd's challenge, Andre accepted and was about to slam Studd before Blassie attacked Andre from behind (as Studd grabbed the ring ropes to prevent himself from being slammed). The Andre-Studd feud raged throughout 1983, and Andre got the upper hand and slammed Studd several times, once with enough force to collapse the entire ring. Several times, the two met inside a steel cage, where André not only slammed Studd, but used a sitdown splash from the top rope onto his chest to knock him out. Despite this, Studd began declaring himself the "True Giant of Wrestling," all while continuing to insist he could not (and had never been) slammed. By 1984, with his feud with Andre still raging, Studd was challenging then-new champion Hulk Hogan for the title; Hogan was also successful on several occasions in slamming Studd.

In late 1984, Studd was also paired with Bobby "The Brain" Heenan, who helped take the André-Studd feud to new heights. This happened during a televised tag team match on WWF Championship Wrestling featuring Studd and fellow Heenan Family member Ken Patera against André the Giant and S. D. Jones. The match ended by disqualification after persistent rulebreaking by Studd and Patera, who attacked André afterwards and cut his hair with Vince McMahon and Bruno Sammartino claiming on commentary that they were robbing André of his dignity. André set out for revenge and accepted Studd's challenge to a "$15,000 Bodyslam Challenge" match at the first WrestleMania, whereby if Andre failed to slam Studd before the time limit (or Studd managed to slam Andre), André would be forced to retire from wrestling. André dominated their Wrestlemania match at Madison Square Garden and won by slamming Studd at 5:54.

After WrestleMania, Studd formed an alliance with fellow Heenan Family member,  King Kong Bundy. The two attacked André at a WWF TV card in Toronto in the summer of 1985, injuring Andre's sternum.

The Studd-Bundy alliance and André continued to feud for the rest of that year and into 1986, with Andre often recruiting faces such as Hulk Hogan, Tony Atlas, Junkyard Dog, and Hillbilly Jim to team with him. Studd participated in the well-publicized 20 man over-the-top battle royal that took place in the Chicago segment of WrestleMania 2 and featured in a memorable pre-match interview with "Mean" Gene Okerlund and then Atlanta Falcons player Bill Fralic, with Studd telling Fralic that he had no business in professional wrestling, and Fralic repeatedly calling Studd "Dudd". The invitational battle royale also featured stars from the National Football league. Although André the Giant was also in the match, Studd set his focus on eliminating Fralic and fellow football player William "The Refrigerator" Perry, who was fresh from a Super Bowl victory with the Chicago Bears earlier that year. Studd successfully eliminated Perry during the match, only to have Perry eliminate Studd while the two were shaking hands. André went on to win the battle royale.

The Andre-Studd feud took on a new dimension in 1986, when, in the wake of Andre's increasing health problems related to gigantism and acromegaly, his role as Fezzik in the movie The Princess Bride, and his planned tour of Japan, a storyline was developed to have André compete in a tag team called The Machines. The "Machines" angle began when André failed to show up for a number of tag team matches against Bundy and Studd. Bobby Heenan successfully campaigned to get André suspended, only for André to reappear shortly thereafter in a mask and billing himself as a Japanese wrestler called the Giant Machine. Studd, along with Bundy and Heenan, insisted that Andre and the Giant Machine were one and the same, and set out to prove their point by vowing to unmask the Giant Machine during a series of tag team matches; the Giant Machine's partners included Blackjack Mulligan (as "Big Machine") and Bill Eadie (as "Super Machine"), with Studd and Bundy saying in interviews that they knew who The Machines were and that they had never heard of Japanese wrestlers with a South-Texas accent (Mulligan/Big Machine) or a South-Florida accent (Eadie/Super Machine), while Bobby Heenan repeatedly claimed that no Japanese wrestler or person was 7'4" and over 500 lbs and spoke with a French accent. However, neither Studd, nor Bundy or Heenan, were able to unmask The Machines, and their true identities remained a secret.

Studd, who long had a reputation of not selling pain to wrestlers with little or no in-ring skills, wrestled a notable match with the "World's Strongest Man" Ted Arcidi at the Boston Garden in mid-1986. During the match, Studd was noticeably wrestling stiff and showing contempt for someone he saw as nothing more than a muscled up weightlifter with no wrestling skills who had no business being in a professional wrestling ring.

The Bundy-Studd team also feuded with other established WWF tag teams in 1986, including The Islanders (Haku and Tama), and contended for the WWF Tag Team Championship held by The British Bulldogs (Davey Boy Smith and the Dynamite Kid). During a televised match in late 1986, Studd and Bundy began arguing after they lost a match to the Bulldogs, and although that seemed to foreshadow a feud between the two, nothing ever came of it. Studd's last match during his original 1980s WWF run came on the November 15, 1986, episode of WWF Superstars of Wrestling, where he teamed with Bundy to defeat The Machines (a match that did not involve the Giant Machine). Despite leaving the WWF, Studd's presence was still made known in a WWF Magazine article published shortly before WrestleMania III, where he supported André in his upcoming match against Hogan (contending that Hogan's friendship with André was a ruse, to duck him as a potential challenger to the title). Studd retired.

Feud with The Heenan Family (1988–1989) 
After retiring for two years, Studd announced his return to the WWF on the Brother Love Show in December 1988. An elated Bobby Heenan appeared on the set to welcome Studd back to the Heenan family. However, with Heenan now also managing his old adversary André the Giant, Studd rejected the offer and ran Heenan off the Brother Love set, thus turning face.

Studd went on to feud with several members of the Heenan family, including André who had turned heel during Studd's absence and Haku (one of the few wrestlers who could bodyslam Studd). Studd won the 1989 Royal Rumble in Houston, which many consider to be the crowning achievement in his WWF career. Studd then served as a special guest referee in the match between Jake "The Snake" Roberts and André at WrestleMania V in Atlantic City. Studd and André had several words with each other both before and during the match and eventually disqualified his nemesis after the giant attacked him from behind. Studd's last match with the WWF was June 4, 1989, with Hillbilly Jim wrestling in Studd's place later that month. Studd quit the WWF over what he felt were poor payoffs.

Independent circuit and retirement (1989–1993) 
Studd wrestled sporadically on the independent circuit until 1993; his last match was against The Honky Tonk Man. He came out with his own line of workout and vitamin supplements and trained Ron Reis, who would make his WCW debut as Big Ron Studd.

Personal life 
Minton and his wife Donna had three children, Robert, Jannelle and Sean, who is also a wrestler.

Death 
In the fall of 1993, Minton noticed a lump in his armpit, and a doctor found a large tumor in his chest. It remitted after chemotherapy, and he was told he might wrestle again in six months, but it returned in 1994. When no suitable bone marrow donor was found, and he was given around a month to live, Minton underwent an autotransplantation procedure with a 7% success rate. Again, the tumor remitted and he went home. Around September 1994, Minton's lungs collapsed and he went back to the hospital. In February 1995, Minton returned for another round of chemotherapy, and it was found that the tumor had spread widely. He died from lymphoma cancer on March 20, 1995. He is buried at Saxonburg Memorial Church Cemetery in Saxonburg, Pennsylvania.

Filmography

Film

Television

Championships and accomplishments 
 50th State Big Time Wrestling
 NWA North American Heavyweight Championship (Hawaii version) (1 time)
 NWA Hawaii Tag Team Championship (1 time) – with Buddy Rose
 Championship Wrestling from Florida
 NWA Florida Global Tag Team Championship (1 time) – with Jimmy Garvin
 European Wrestling Union
 EWU World Super Heavyweight Championship (1 time)
 Georgia Championship Wrestling
 NWA National Tag Team Championship (1 time) – with Super Destroyer
 Maple Leaf Wrestling
 NWA Canadian Heavyweight Championship (Toronto version) (1 time)
 Mid-Atlantic Championship Wrestling
 NWA Mid-Atlantic Tag Team Championship (4 times) – with Ric Flair (1), Ken Patera (1), Masked Superstar#1 (1), and Roddy Piper (1)
 NWA Big Time Wrestling
 NWA American Heavyweight Championship (1 time)
 NWA Texas Tag Team Championship (1 time) – with Bull Ramos
 NWA Brass Knuckles Championship (1 time)
 NWA Southern Championship Wrestling
 NWA Tennessee Southern Heavyweight Championship (1 time)
 Pro Wrestling Illustrated
 PWI Tag Team of the Year (1976) – with Killer Kowalski
 PWI ranked him #60 of the top 500 singles wrestlers of the "PWI Years" in 2003
 World Championship Wrestling
 WCW Hall of Fame (Class of 1995)
 World Wrestling Association
 WWA World Tag Team Championship (1 time) – with Ox Baker
 World (Wide) Wrestling Federation/Entertainment
 WWWF World Tag Team Championship (1 time) – with Executioner#1
 Royal Rumble (1989)
 WWE Hall of Fame (Class of 2004)
 Wrestling Observer Newsletter
 Most Overrated (1984)
 Worst Feud of the Year (1984) – vs. Andre The Giant
 Worst Feud of the Year (1986) – with King Kong Bundy vs. The Machines

See also 

 List of premature professional wrestling deaths

References

External links 
 
 
 
 

1948 births
1995 deaths
20th-century American male actors
20th-century professional wrestlers
American male film actors
American male professional wrestlers
American male television actors
American military police officers
Deaths from cancer in Virginia
Deaths from liver cancer
Deaths from Hodgkin lymphoma
Masked wrestlers
Professional wrestlers from Pennsylvania
Stampede Wrestling alumni
The Heenan Family members
United States Army soldiers
WWE Hall of Fame inductees
NWA Florida Global Tag Team Champions
WCWA Brass Knuckles Champions
NWA Canadian Heavyweight Champions
NWA National Tag Team Champions